Sven Henning (born 18 September 1940) is a Norwegian theatre instructor and director.

He was born in Trondheim, and started his instructor career at Trøndelag Teater from 1966 to 1969. He moved on to instruct at Den Nationale Scene from 1971 to 1972, and was then director of the Bergen International Festival and Bergen Philharmonic Orchestra from 1972 to 1976. From 1976 to 1982 he was the director of Den Nationale Scene. He later worked at the Norwegian National Academy of Theatre and Concerts Norway.

References

1940 births
Living people
Norwegian male stage actors
Norwegian theatre directors
Academic staff of the Oslo National Academy of the Arts
People from Trondheim